Khai Hoan Land Group Joint Stock Company is a Vietnamese real estate developer and agency. Founded in 2009 by Nguyễn Khải Hoàn, it is headquartered in District 7, Ho Chi Minh City. In the south of the country alone, Khai Hoan Land maintains the largest market share by volume, which make it the region's leading property developer and real estate agency.

It also pioneers in building a unique company culture named “reading culture”. Books have been presented at all training courses as well as awards events, and also indispensable gifts for philanthropy-themed events.

History
In 2009, Khai Hoan Land was official established with a charter capital of 6 billion VND.

In April 2010, the company increased its charter capital to 36 billion VND.

In 2014, Khai Hoan Land reached an agreement with Tan Lien Phat Investment Corporation to distribute Vinhomes Central Park Project.

In 2015, it opened 15 concentrated divisions

In 2016, Khai Hoan Land became a strategic partner to VinaCapital Group.

In March 2017, the company raised its charter capital to VND 3,000 billion

In December 2020, Khai Hoan Land was official transformed into a public company with a charter capital of VND 1,600 billion

In 2021, Khai Hoan Land was listed on Ho Chi Minh City Stock Exchange (HOSE) with stock code “KHG”, succeeded in selling 14,817,547 shares to the public, raised its charter capital to VND 3,188 billion.

In 2022, Khai Hoan Land tends to pay a dividend and issue shares. The company increased its charter capital to VND 4,431 billion and total number of concentrated divisions to 50 in the whole country.

Subsidiaries and affiliates
 Khải Hoàn Group Co., Ltd
 An Thinh Phat Property Investment Co., Ltd
 An Pha Property Investment & Development Co., Ltd
 Vung Tau Khai Hoan Group Co., Ltd

Leadership

 Nguyễn Khải Hoàn: Chairman
 Đinh Nhật Hạnh: Vice Chairman & CEO
 Phùng Quang Hải: Vice CEO, Board of Director member
 Phạm Thị Minh Phụ: Vice CEO, Board member
 Võ Công Sơn: Board member
 Trần Mạnh Toàn: Board single-member
 Phạm Thị Hòa: Board single-member
 Trần Văn Thành: Vice CEO
 Lê Thị Như Ca: Vice CEO
 Dương Thanh Thương: Vice CEO

Khải Hoàn Group
Khải Hoàn Group is one of the Khai Hoan Land notable associate companies. It is a Vietnamese diversified conglomerate which encompasses a variety of industries such as real estate, education, technology, health care, agriculture, entertainment. It is chaired by Nguyễn Khải Hoàn, who holds 80% of the authorized stocks. In 2019, the company raised its charter capital to VND 2,600 billion. As of December 2020, it raised to VND 5,560 billion.

See also
 Nguyễn Khải Hoàn
 VinaCapital Group

References

External links
 
 
 Khai Hoan Land: Promoting reading culture in remote communities
 Khai Hoan Land Group JSC Company & People - Barron's
 Khai Hoan Land Group Joint Stock Company Profile - Dun & Bradstreet

Companies of Vietnam
Companies listed on the Ho Chi Minh City Stock Exchange
Companies based in Ho Chi Minh City
Companies established in 2009
2021 initial public offerings
Real estate companies of Vietnam